Quds or Beitol moghadas refer to the city of Jerusalem. This name is used in some Persian poems, ancient literature of Persia, geographical books, travel literature, and Persian atlases and maps.

Examples
The following books are some examples of literature that use the name "Quds" to refer Jerusalem:

 Safarnama
 Habib al-Siyar
 Hudud al-'Alam
 Shahnameh

Jerusalem is normally referred to as "Beyt al-Moqaddas" in Persian language and literature, the above-mentioned references included. "Quds" on the other hand is a politicized term used by the Islamic Republic since 1979.

See also
 Quds Day

References

Persian literature
History of Jerusalem